Mashpee may refer to:

Mashpee, Massachusetts, a town in Massachusetts
Mashpee Commons, an open-air shopping center
Mashpee High School, in the town of Mashpee
Mashpee Middle School, in the town of Mashpee
Mashpee Neck, Massachusetts, a census-designated place (CDP) in the town of Mashpee
Mashpee Pond, in the town of Mashpee
Mashpee River, a tidal river in Mashpee
Mashpee River Reservation, a park in the town of Mashpee
Mashpee people, a historical sub-group of the Wampanoag
Mashpee Wampanoag Tribe, a federally-recognized tribe